The 1985 British Speedway Championship was the 25th edition of the British Speedway Championship. The Final took place on 12 June at Brandon in Coventry, England. The Championship was won by Kenny Carter, who scored a 15-point maximum. John Davis was second, while Kelvin Tatum completed the rostrum in third place.

Qualification Round

Quarter-final

Semi finals

Final 
12 June 1985
 Brandon Stadium, Coventry

See also 
 British Speedway Championship
 1985 Individual Speedway World Championship

References 

British Speedway Championship
Great Britain